The 2016 All-Ireland Intermediate Hurling Championship is the 33rd staging of the All-Ireland hurling championship for players in the intermediate grade since its establishment by the Gaelic Athletic Association in 1961. The championship began on 22 May 2016 and ended on 6 August 2016.

Galway were the defending champions, however, they were defeated by Kilkenny in the Leinster final. Kilkenny won the title after defeating Clare by 5-16 to 1-16 in the final.

Team summaries

Results

Leinster Intermediate Hurling Championship

Semi-final

Final

Munster Intermediate Hurling Championship

Quarter-final

Semi-finals

Final

All-Ireland Intermediate Hurling Championship

Final

Statistics

Top scorers
Overall

Single game

Scoring

First goal of the championship
Brian Hogan for Tipperary against Cork (Munster quarter-final)
Widest winning margin: 12 points 
Kilkenny 5-16 - 1-16 Clare (All-Ireland final)
Most goals in a match: 6
Kilkenny 5-16 - 1-16 Clare (All-Ireland final)
Most points in a match: 44
Clare 1-26 - 2-18 Limerick (Munster final)
Most goals by one team in a match: 5
Kilkenny 5-16 - 1-16 Clare (All-Ireland final)
 Highest aggregate score: 53
Clare 1-26 - 2-18 Limerick (Munster final)
Most goals scored by a losing team: 2
Wexford 2-14 - 3-14 Kilkenny
Waterford 2-12 - 3-20 Clare
Limerick 2-18 - 1-26 Clare

References

Intermediate
All-Ireland Intermediate Hurling Championship